This is a list of NUTS2 statistical regions of Bulgaria by Human Development Index as of 2021.

References 

Human Development Index
Ranked lists of country subdivisions
Economy of Bulgaria-related lists